Anglo-Amalgamated Productions was a British film production company, run by Nat Cohen and Stuart Levy, which operated from 1945 until roughly 1971 (after which it was absorbed into EMI Films). Low-budget and second features, often produced at Merton Park Studios, formed much of its output. It was the UK distributor of many films produced by American International Pictures (AIP), who distributed AA's films in the United States.

It is remembered for producing the first 12 Carry On films (all of which were produced at Pinewood Studios) and B-movie series such as The Scales of Justice, Scotland Yard and the Edgar Wallace Mysteries. It did, however, produce the Michael Powell film Peeping Tom (1960) and such films as John Schlesinger's A Kind of Loving (1962), Billy Liar (1963) or Ken Loach's Poor Cow (1967). The company's distribution arrangement with American International Pictures led to the last two films in Roger Corman's series of films based on the works of Edgar Allan Poe, The Masque of the Red Death and The Tomb of Ligeia (both 1964), being joint productions made in the UK. AA's film distribution subsidiary was Anglo Amalgamated Film Distributors Ltd. Anglo had a film production arm called Insignia Films.

In 1962, Associated British Picture Corporation (ABPC) purchased 50% of the shares of Anglo Amalgamated. In 1967 they took over 74%.

At its peak Anglo Amalgamated made a return of £3 million a year.

Its library is now owned by StudioCanal via Cannon Films.

Selected credits

Assassin for Hire (1951)
Mystery Junction (1951)
Ghost Ship (1952)
Wide Boy (1952)
The Floating Dutchman (1952)
Street of Shadows (1953)
Noose for a Lady (1953)
Counterspy (1953)
The Sleeping Tiger (1954)
Dangerous Voyage (1954)
Little Red Monkey (1955)
Postmark for Danger (1955)
Dial 999 (1955)
Timeslip (1955)
Confession (1955)
The Brain Machine (1956)
The Intimate Stranger (1956)
Johnny, You're Wanted (1956)
The Hypnotist (1957)
Cat Girl (1957)
The Counterfeit Plan (1957)
The Flying Scot (1957)
The Tommy Steele Story (1957)
Man in the Shadow (1957)
Carry on Sergeant (1958)
The Duke Wore Jeans (1958)
Escapement (1958)
The Long Knife (1958)
Carry On Nurse (1959)
Horrors of the Black Museum (1959)
Carry On Teacher (1959)
Please Turn Over (1959)
The Headless Ghost (1959)
Watch Your Stern (1960)
Peeping Tom (1960)
No Kidding (1960)
Carry On Constable (1960)
Circus of Horrors (1960)
The Criminal (1960)
Carry On Regardless (1961)
On the Fiddle (1961)
Seven Keys (1961)
Payroll (1961)
Raising the Wind (1961)
Dentist on the Job (1961)
The Frightened City (1961)
Night of the Eagle (1962)
A Kind of Loving (1962)
Play It Cool (1962)
Carry On Cruising (1962)
Crooks Anonymous (1962)
She'll Have to Go (1962)
Twice Round the Daffodils (1962)
Some People (1962)
The Mind Benders (1963)
Nurse on Wheels (1963)
Unearthly Stranger (1963)
Billy Liar (1963)
The Iron Maiden (1963)
Carry On Cabby (1963)
Carry On Jack (1963)
Gonks Go Beat (1964)
Carry On Spying (1964)
This Is My Street (1964)
The Masque of the Red Death (co-produced with AIP, 1964)
The Tomb of Ligeia (co-produced with AIP, 1964)
Nothing But the Best (1964)
Catch Us If You Can (1964)
Carry On Cleo (1964)
Three Hats for Lisa (1965)
Game for Three Losers (1965)
The Big Job (1965)
Carry On Cowboy (1965)
Invasion (1965)
The Face of Fu Manchu (1965)
Darling (1965)
Carry On Screaming (1966)
Our Man in Marrakesh (1966)
The Brides of Fu Manchu (1966)
Circus of Fear (1966)
Triple Cross (1966)
Five Golden Dragons (1967)
The Vengeance of Fu Manchu (1967)
Jules Verne's Rocket to the Moon (1967)
The Million Eyes of Sumuru (1967)
Poor Cow (1967)
Eve (1968)
Shalako (1968)
The Blood of Fu Manchu (1968)
All Neat in Black Stockings (1969)
All the Way Up (1970)
Spring and Port Wine (1970)
Entertaining Mr. Sloane (1970)
The 14 (1973)

References

External links
 Anglo-Amalgamated at BFI Screenonline
Insignia Films at BFI

1945 establishments in England
1971 disestablishments in England
British companies established in 1945
Mass media companies disestablished in 1971
EMI
Film distributors of the United Kingdom
Film production companies of the United Kingdom
British companies disestablished in 1971
Mass media companies established in 1945